Michael Ruse  (born 21 June 1940) is a British-born Canadian philosopher of science who specializes in the philosophy of biology and works on the relationship between science and religion, the creation–evolution controversy, and the demarcation problem within science. Ruse currently teaches at Florida State University.

Career
Ruse was born in Birmingham, England, attending Bootham School, York. He took his undergraduate degree at the University of Bristol (1962), his master's degree at McMaster University, Hamilton, Ontario (1964), and Ph.D. at the University of Bristol (1970).

Ruse taught at the University of Guelph in Ontario, Canada for 35 years. Since his retirement from Guelph, he has taught at Florida State University and is the Lucyle T. Werkmeister Professor of Philosophy (2000–present). In 1986, he was elected as a Fellow of both the Royal Society of Canada and the American Association for the Advancement of Science. He has received honorary doctorates from the University of Bergen, Norway (1990), McMaster University, Ontario, Canada (2003) and the University of New Brunswick, Fredericton, New Brunswick, Canada (2007). In September 2014 he was made an Honorary Doctor of Science by University College London.

Ruse was a key witness for the plaintiff in the 1981 test case (McLean v. Arkansas) of the state law permitting the teaching of "creation science" in the Arkansas school system. The federal judge ruled that the state law was unconstitutional.

His 1996 book on the idea of progress in biology (orthogenesis), Monad to Man, had a mixed reception from other philosophers of biology. 
Peter J. Bowler described it as an important and controversial book on the status of evolutionism. 
Ron Amundson called Ruse an analytic and empiricist philosopher, but found Ruse's handling of structuralism "less satisfactory" than of the adaptationist, Darwinian traditions. He called Ruse's writing style "bluff, unselfconscious, and opinionated" and finds Ruse sarcastic, "scarcely a neutral observer". Michael Ghiselin criticised Ruse as a "politically correct" "academic bigot", disagreed with Ruse's narrative about phylogenetics, and accused him of "completely ignor[ing] recent work such as by Carl Woese, "neglect[ing] data" that contradict his thesis. Ironically, in Ghiselin's view, Ruse's own epistemological ideal for science relied on the idea of Progress.

Ruse delivered some of the 2001 Gifford Lectures in Natural Theology at the University of Glasgow. His lectures on Evolutionary Naturalism, "A Darwinian Understanding of Epistemology" and "A Darwinian Understanding of Ethics," are collected in The Nature and Limits of Human Understanding (ed. Anthony Sanford, T & T Clark, 2003). Ruse debates regularly with William A. Dembski, a proponent of intelligent design. Ruse takes the position that it is possible to reconcile the Christian faith with evolutionary theory. Ruse founded the journal Biology and Philosophy, of which he is now Emeritus Editor, and has published numerous books and articles. He cites the influence of his late colleague Ernan McMullin.

Since 2013, Ruse has been listed on the Advisory Council of the National Center for Science Education.

In 2014, Ruse was named the Bertrand Russell Society's award winner for his dedication to science and reason.

Ruse has sought to reconcile science and religion, a position which has brought him into conflict with Richard Dawkins and Pharyngula science blogger PZ Myers. Ruse has engaged in heated exchanges with new atheists. According to Ruse in 2009, "Richard Dawkins, in his best selling The God Delusion, likens me to Neville Chamberlain, the pusillanimous appeaser of Hitler at Munich. Jerry Coyne reviewed one of my books (Can a Darwinian be a Christian?) using the Orwellian quote that only an intellectual could believe the nonsense I believe in. And non-stop blogger P. Z. Myers has referred to me as a 'clueless gobshite.'"  Ruse said new atheists do the side of science a "grave disservice", a "disservice to scholarship", and that "Dawkins in The God Delusion would fail any introductory philosophy or religion course", and that The God Delusion makes him "ashamed to be an atheist".  Ruse concluded, saying "I am proud to be the focus of the invective of the new atheists. They are a bloody disaster".

Personal life
Ruse has two children from his first marriage, and has been married to his second wife since 1985, with whom he has three children. Ruse is an atheist, although he rejects the New Atheism movement.

Selected works
The Darwinian revolution (1979) 
Is science sexist? and other problems in the biomedical sciences (1981) 
Darwinism defended, a guide to the evolution controversies (1982) 
Sociobiology, sense or nonsense? (1st ed. 1979, 2nd ed. 1985) 
Taking Darwin seriously: a naturalistic approach to philosophy (1986) 
Homosexuality: A Philosophical Inquiry (1988) 
The Philosophy of biology today (1988) 
The Darwinian paradigm: essays on its history, philosophy and religious implications (1989) 
 Evolution: The First Four Billion Years. (edited with Michael Travis) (2009) 
Evolutionary naturalism: selected essays (1995) 
Monad to man: the concept of progress in evolutionary biology (1996) 
But is it science? the philosophical question in the creation/evolution controversy (1996) (ed.) 
Mystery of mysteries: is evolution a social construction? (1999) 
Biology and the foundation of ethics (1999) 
Can a Darwinian be a Christian? the relationship between science and religion (2001) 
The evolution wars: a guide to the debates (2003) 
Darwin and Design: Does evolution have a purpose? (2003) 
Darwinian Heresies (edited with Abigail Lustig and Robert J. Richards) (2004) 
The Evolution-Creation Struggle (2005) 
Darwinism and its Discontents (2006) 
Cambridge Companion to the Origin of Species (edited with Robert J. Richards) (2008) 
Philosophy after Darwin (2009) 
Defining Darwin: Essays on the History and Philosophy of Evolutionary Biology (2009) 
Science and Spirituality: Making room for faith in the age of science (2010) 
The Philosophy of Human Evolution (2012) 
The Gaia Hypothesis: Science on a Pagan Planet (2013) 
Atheism: What Everyone Needs to Know (2015) 
Darwinism as Religion: What Literature Tells Us about Evolution (2016) Oxford University Press
On Purpose (2018) Princeton University Press
Why We Hate: Understanding the Roots of Human Conflict (2022) Oxford University Press

References

Sources

External links
Michael Ruse's Homepage at Florida State
Michael Ruse's page at FSU's History and Philosophy of Science site
Michael Ruse on Charles Darwin: Evolution Is No Monkey Business
Can a Christian be a Darwinian? Lecture given in 2007 at The Faraday Institute for Science and Religion
Speech by Michael Ruse 1993 to American Association for the Advancement of Science
Biography and summary of Gifford Lectures (2001, University of Glasgow), by Dr Brannon Hancock
An autobiographical interview with Michael Ruse at What Is It Like to Be a Philosopher?

1940 births
Living people
British emigrants to Canada
Canadian atheists
Charles Darwin biographers
Critics of creationism
People educated at Bootham School
Canadian philosophers
Canadian skeptics
Fellows of the Royal Society of Canada
Florida State University faculty
People from Birmingham, West Midlands
Philosophers of science
McMaster University alumni
Philosophers of biology
Philosophers of sexuality
Canadian expatriates in the United States